The Dombra, also known as Dombyra or Tambura is a long-necked musical string instrument used by the Kazakhs, Uzbeks, Hazaras, Nogais,  Tatars and Balochs in their traditional folk music. The Dombura shares certain characteristics with the komuz and dutar instruments, such as its long, thin neck and oblong body shape. It is a popular instrument mostly among Turkic and Iranic communities in Central Asian countries such as Kazakhstan, Uzbekistan, Tajikistan, Turkmenistan, Afghanistan and Pakistan.

Varieties
The instrument differs slightly in different regions. The Kazakh dombyra has frets and is played by strumming with the hand or plucking each string individually, with an occasional tap on the main surface of the instrument. While the strings are traditionally made of sinew, modern dombras are usually produced using nylon strings. One of the greatest dombra players was the Kazakh folk musician and composer Kurmangazy Sagyrbayuly, who had a major influence on the development of Kazakh musical culture, including music for the dombra; his musical composition "Adai" is popular in Kazakhstan and abroad.

In 2012, the elektrodombyra was created.

The Turkestani and Badakhshani  are fretless with a body and neck carved from a single block of wood, usually mulberry or apricot. The  is played with much banging and scratching on the instrument to help give a percussive sound. The two strings are made of nylon (in modern times) or gut. They cross a short bridge to a pin at the other end of the body. There is a tiny sound hole in the back of the instrument, while the top is thick wood. It is not finished with any varnish, filing/sanding of any kind, and as with all other Turkic instruments there is some decoration.

The dumbyra is the equivalent instrument of the Volga Tatars and Bashkirs. A performer strikes all the strings at the same time. The upper string performs the bourdon tone and the lower string performs the melody. A  is used as a solo as well as an ensemble instrument.

History 
The dombyra first appeared in the Middle Ages. For example, the works of Aby Nasyr Al-Farabi refer to a tambur-like musical instrument similar to the dombyra. An instrument similar to the Dombyra existed in almost every country in Central Asia. Within the last century, there have been many great composers and Dombyra players, such as Kurmangazy, Kazangap, and Tattimbet.

The importance of the dombra in the culture of Kazakhstan was marked by initiating the Dombra Day in 2018. The National Dombra Day is celebrated in Kazakhstan every first Sunday of July.

Dombra in ensemble and epic performance

The Kazakh poet Abay Qunanbayuli is often shown holding a dombra at rest and many hold it in high regard as a national symbol among the post-Soviet nations of the Commonwealth of Independent States. The dombra is played by Erzhan Alimbetov in the Ulytau band.

It is mentioned in the epic poem "Zayatulyak and Hiuhiliu". In the second half of the 20th century, several reconstructions were carried out. At present, the revivalist work continues. The modern wooden  has a pear-shaped or an oval form.

References in popular culture

This instrument has become a part of an Internet phenomenon after a video clip from SuperStar KZ, the Kazakh equivalent of the Idol series, was posted on YouTube. The video includes two contestants singing and a third one singing and playing the dombra (Ernar Kaldynov), which caused the popularity. The name of the original song is Freestailo by R.Lizer, a Kazakh man.

Dombyra as an instrument is being popularized through Dombyra Parties, a flash mob-like movement of Kazakh youth organized via social media. The videos of Dombyra Party activities are shared on YouTube, Facebook etc.

Range and tablature
Many folk and regional tunings have existed, though below is the most accepted academic DG tuning for standard concert dombra prima of Kazakhstan.

There are different classifications of Dombyra, for example Dombyra for singing songs or  has 8-9 frets, dombyra for kyus has more than 20 frets.

See also 
 Tanbur

References

External links

Kui on dombra
 Kazakh national Kui - Nauai, author Dina Nurpeisova
 Kazakh national Kui - Adai
How to play the dombra
 Learning dombyra on YouTube
Other links
 Song "Dombira" by Arslanbek Sultanbekov
 Dombıra - An Ancient Turkish Music Instrument
 video clip from SuperStar KZ

 
Necked bowl lutes
Afghan musical instruments
Bashkir musical instruments
Kazakhstani musical instruments
Kyrgyz musical instruments
Russian musical instruments
Tatar musical instruments
Uzbekistani musical instruments